Seuss is a crater on Mercury.  Its name was adopted by the International Astronomical Union (IAU) in 2012. It is named for the American author and cartoonist Theodor Seuss Geisel, better known as Dr. Seuss.

Seuss is one of the largest craters of the Kuiperian system on Mercury. The largest is Bartók crater.

Hollows are present within Seuss.

The Acadia Rupes is an escarpment located west of Seuss.

References

Impact craters on Mercury